OM TV is a subscription based-channel, entirely dedicated to the French football team Olympique de Marseille. The channel offers Marseille fans exclusive interviews with players and staff, full matches, including replays of all Ligue 1, Coupe de France, Coupe de la Ligue, Champions League/UEFA Cup and friendly games, in addition to vintage matches, footballing news and other themed programming. OM TV stopped broadcasting on August 31, 2018 for her digital modernization on the social networks and the website.

References

External links
www.om.net

Olympique de Marseille
Sports television networks in France
Television stations in France
Defunct television channels in France
Television channels and stations established in 1999
1999 establishments in France
Mass media in Marseille
Football club television channels